Phileas Fogg is a brand of snack products in the United Kingdom that was created in 1982 by Derwent Valley Foods. The brand is named for Phileas Fogg, the protagonist of Jules Verne's Around the World in Eighty Days, and the products are made in Consett, County Durham. When by Derwent Valley Foods was sold in 1993, its products were rebranded but poorly received, leading to a decline in popularity. The brand was relaunched in 2009.

Early years
The Phileas Fogg snack range was launched in 1982 by Derwent Valley Foods, a company founded by Roger McKechnie, Keith Gill, Ray McGhee and John Pike, who invested £67,000 of their own money. The aim was to create a snack targeted to adults and branded with a recognisable character. The range included different flavours "from around the world" such as miniature garlic breads and tortilla chips.

Decline in the 1990s
Between the late 1980s and early 1990s, Phileas Fogg snacks achieved a turnover of more than £30 million. In 1993 the brand was purchased by United Biscuits for £24 million. The four founders left after the sale while United Biscuits made significant changes to the packaging and identity, precipitating a decline in popularity.

2009 relaunch
United Biscuits relaunched the brand in 2009 after research showed a large number of British consumers were still aware of it.  the brand is still sold but is now owned by KP Snacks and consists of a much-revised product range.

References

Snack food manufacturers of the United Kingdom
Brand name snack foods
British snack foods